Rodney or Rod Evans may refer to:

Rodney J. Evans (1948–1969), Medal of Honor recipient, killed in action during the Vietnam War
Rodney Evans (filmmaker) (born 1971), American filmmaker and lecturer
Rodney Evans (footballer) (born 1946), Australian rules footballer for Richmond
Rod Evans (born 1947), English singer
Rod L. Evans, American academic